Art Welch (born 16 April 1944) is a Jamaican former professional soccer player who played in the North American Soccer League and Major Indoor Soccer League.

He began his career in Jamaica with Cavaliers FC, alongside twin brother Asher.

In May 1977, the Las Vegas Quicksilvers traded Welch to the Washington Diplomats in exchange for Tom Galati.

Welch also represented the Jamaica national team in international play, appearing in qualifying matches for the 1966 and 1970 World Cup tournaments.

References

External links
 NASL/MISL career stats

1944 births
Living people
Sportspeople from Kingston, Jamaica
Atlanta Chiefs players
Baltimore Bays players
Jamaican footballers
Jamaica international footballers
Jamaican expatriate footballers
Jamaican emigrants to the United States
Major Indoor Soccer League (1978–1992) players
National Professional Soccer League (1967) players
North American Soccer League (1968–1984) players
North American Soccer League (1968–1984) indoor players
San Diego Jaws players
San Francisco Fog (MISL) players
San Jose Earthquakes (1974–1988) players
Vancouver Whitecaps (1974–1984) players
Washington Diplomats (NASL) players
Expatriate soccer players in the United States
Expatriate soccer players in Canada
Jamaican expatriate sportspeople in Canada
Jamaican expatriate sportspeople in the United States
Jamaican twins
Twin sportspeople
Association football forwards
Cavalier F.C. players